Events from the year 1563 in Ireland.

Incumbent
Monarch: Elizabeth I

Events
April–September 11 – Thomas Radclyffe, 3rd Earl of Sussex, Lord Lieutenant of Ireland, based in Armagh, campaigns against Shane O'Neill.
May 18 – commission for administration of the Oath of Supremacy to all ecclesiastics and state servants.
After September (possible year) – introduction of the potato to Ireland by John Hawkins.

Births
May – Arthur Chichester, 1st Baron Chichester, English administrator and soldier, Lord Deputy of Ireland (d. 1625)
Approximate date – Niall Ó Glacáin, physician (d. 1653)

Deaths
Diarmuid Mac Bruideadha, poet.

References

 
1560s in Ireland
Ireland
Years of the 16th century in Ireland